Work colleges are colleges in the United States that require students to work and integrate that work into the college learning experience. A work college is a public or private non-profit, four-year degree-granting institution with a commitment to community service. To qualify for Federal designation as a work college, at least half of the full-time students, including all students who reside on campus, must participate in a "comprehensive work-learning-service" program as an essential and core component of their educational programs, regardless of their academic program or their financial need.  

Students typically work 6 to 15 hours per week while enrolled. Their compensation helps offset the cost of tuition, and student labor can lower operational costs. Work Colleges differ from need-based forms of financial support such as Federal Work Study, because students cannot "buy" their way out of the work requirement; participation is part of the educational experience. Students are regularly assessed on their work performance, and can be dismissed from the institution for non-performance. Students typically work on campus, though some work colleges allow students to work at off-campus jobs.

Currently, there are nine federally recognized work colleges in the Work College Consortium, meeting the requirements for operation as overseen by the U.S. Department of Education. 

Alice Lloyd College in Pippa Passes, Kentucky
Berea College in Berea, Kentucky
Bethany Global University in Bloomington, Minnesota
Blackburn College in Carlinville, Illinois
College of the Ozarks in Point Lookout, Missouri
Kuyper College in Grand Rapids, Michigan
Paul Quinn College in Dallas, Texas
Sterling College in Craftsbury Common, Vermont
Warren Wilson College in Asheville, North Carolina

Predecessor
A predecessor of the work college is the Manual labor college movement of the 1820s up to 1860, approximately. It also combined work, usually agricultural or mechanical, with preparatory or college study, often preparation for the ministry. Although it helped students financially, equally if not more important were the work's perceived healthful effects on the bodies and minds of the students. To see physical work as bodily and psychologically beneficial was at the time a relatively new idea.

See also
 Manual labor college
 Deep Springs College
 Land-grant university

References

Types of university or college
 
college
Internships
Education finance in the United States